Pilar Montenegro (born María del Pilar Montenegro López on May 31, 1972, in Mexico City, Mexico) is a Mexican Latin pop singer and actress.

Biography
When Montenegro was 10 years old she landed her first acting part in the TV series Juguemos A Cantar. In 1989 she joined the group Garibaldi. During the mid '90s she began to appear in soap operas and left Garibaldi to pursue a solo career. By 1996 she released her debut album Son del Corazón.

In 2001, Montenegro re-emerged into the music scene by the hand of former husband and executive music producer Jorge Reynoso, after 6 months of recording with the music production of Rudy Perez they released her second album Desahogo. The album produced the hit single, a cover of Yolandita Monge’s Quitame Ese Hombre.
The hit single spent 13 consecutive Weeks at Number 1 on the Hot Latin Tracks of Billboard. With the success of the album "Desahogo" Pilar Montenegro won multiple awards, including 4 Latin Billboard Awards.

Discography

Filmography

Awards and nominations

References

External links

 Pilar Montenegro biography esmas.com (en esmas) 
 Pilar Montenegro latest webpage
 Pilar Montenegro Fan Page

1972 births
Living people
Mexican telenovela actresses
Mexican television actresses
Mexican film actresses
Mexican stage actresses
20th-century Mexican actresses
21st-century Mexican actresses
Actresses from Mexico City
Singers from Mexico City
People from Mexico City
EMI Latin artists
Mexican women pop singers
Women in Latin music